KLWO (90.3 FM, "K-Love") is a radio station broadcasting a Contemporary Christian music format. Licensed to Longview, Washington, United States, the station is currently owned by Educational Media Foundation.

References

External links

LWO
Longview, Washington
K-Love radio stations
Radio stations established in 1987
1987 establishments in Washington (state)
Educational Media Foundation radio stations